

The following is a partial list of Honors colleges and programs in the United States.

Alabama
 (Related: List of colleges and universities in Alabama)
Alabama A&M University: Honors Program
 Alabama State University: W.E.B. DuBois Honors Program
 Auburn University: Honors College
 Samford University: University Fellows honors program
Tuskegee University: Honors Program
 University of Alabama: Honors College
 University of Alabama at Birmingham: Honors College
 University of Alabama in Huntsville: Honors College

Alaska
 (Related: List of colleges and universities in Alaska)
University of Alaska Anchorage: Honors College
University of Alaska Fairbanks: UAF Honors College

Arizona
 (Related: List of colleges and universities in Arizona)
 Arizona State University: Barrett, The Honors College
 University of Arizona: The Honors College

Arkansas
 (Related: List of colleges and universities in Arkansas)
 University of Arkansas: University of Arkansas Honors College
 University of Central Arkansas: Norbert O. Schedler Honors College

California
 (Related: List of colleges and universities in California)
 Azusa Pacific University Honors College
 California Polytechnic State University University Honors Program
 California State University, Chico Honors Program
 California State University, Fresno Honors College
 California State University, Sacramento Honors Program
 San Diego State University Honors Program
 San Jose State University Humanities Honors Program
 Biola University Torrey Honors Institute
 University of California, Davis Honors Program
 University of California, Los Angeles Honors Program
 University of California, Riverside Honors Program
 University of California, San Diego Honors College-Muir Honors College-Revelle
 University of California, Santa Barbara Honors Program
 University of California, Santa Cruz College Scholars Program
 University of California, Irvine  UC Irvine Campuswide Honors Program
 University of San Diego Honors Program
La Sierra University Honors Program

Colorado
 (Related: List of colleges and universities in Colorado)
 Regis University
 Colorado State University Honors Program
 Metropolitan State University of Denver Honors Program
 University of Colorado Honors Program
 University of Denver Honors Program
 University of Colorado Colorado Springs Honors Program (UCCS-Honors)

Connecticut
 (Related: List of colleges and universities in Connecticut)
Central Connecticut State University 
Eastern Connecticut State University 
Southern Connecticut State University 
University of Connecticut Honors Program
Western Connecticut State University

Delaware
 (Related: List of colleges and universities in Delaware)
 University of Delaware Honors Program

District of Columbia
 (Related: List of colleges and universities in Washington, D.C.)
Georgetown University's Landegger Honors Program in International Business Diplomacy (IBD)
Gallaudet University's Honors Program
American University's Honors Program
Catholic University of America's University Honors Program
 George Washington University's University Honors Program (UHP)
 Howard University College of Arts and Sciences's Honors Program

Florida
 (Related: List of colleges and universities in Florida)

Public institutions 
 Burnett Honors College University of Central Florida
 Florida A&M University 
 Florida Atlantic University Harriet L. Wilkes Honors College
 Florida International University 
 Florida State University 
 New College of Florida (the institution is an honors college, itself)
 St. Petersburg College 
 University of Florida 
 University of South Florida 
 University of West Florida 
 Miami Dade College

Private Institutions 
 Flagler College 
 Nova Southeastern University 
 Southeastern University

Georgia
 (Related: List of colleges and universities in Georgia)
 University of Georgia, UGA Honors College
 Albany State University, Albany State Honors Program
 Columbus State University, Honors College
 Clark Atlanta University, CAU Honors Program
 Fort Valley State University Fort Valley Honors Program
 Kennesaw State University, Kenesaw Honors College
 Georgia Southern University, Georgia Southern Honors Program
 Georgia Institute of Technology, Georgia Tech Honors Program
 Georgia State University, Georgia State Honors College
 Savannah State University, Savanah State Honors Program

Hawaii
 (Related: List of colleges and universities in Hawaii)
University of Hawaii at Manoa Honors Program

Idaho
 (Related: List of colleges and universities in Idaho)
University of Idaho

Boise State University

Illinois
 (Related: List of colleges and universities in Illinois)
 Augustana College Honors Program
 Northern Illinois University Honors Program
 University of Illinois at Chicago Honors College
 Western Illinois University Centennial Honors College
Southern Illinois University Carbondale 
Roosevelt University (Honors Program)

Indiana
 (Related: List of colleges and universities in Indiana)
 Indiana University Bloomington Hutton Honors College
 Valparaiso University Christ College Honors College
 Purdue University, Purdue Honors College
 Indiana Wesleyan University, John Wesley Honors College
 Ball State University, https://www.bsu.edu/academics/collegesanddepartments/honorscollege Ball State University Honors College

Iowa 
 (Related: List of colleges and universities in Iowa)
 Dordt College Kuyper Scholars Program
 Iowa State University Honors Program
 Loras College Loras College Honors Program
 University of Iowa Honors Program

Kentucky
 (Related: List of colleges and universities in Kentucky)
 Eastern Kentucky University Honors Program
 Georgetown College Honors Program
 University of Kentucky Lewis Honors College
 Western Kentucky University Honors College
 Kentucky State University Whitney Young Honors School

Louisiana
 (Related: List of colleges and universities in Louisiana)
 Grambling State University Earl Lester Cole Honors College
 Louisiana Scholars' College
 Louisiana State University Honors College
 McNeese State University Honors College
 Nicholls State University Honors Program
 Northwestern State University
 Honors Program
 Louisiana Scholars' College
 Southeastern Louisiana University Honors Program
 Southern University Honors College
 Tulane University Newcomb-Tulane College
 University of Louisiana at Lafayette Honors Program
 University of Louisiana at Monroe Honors Program
 University of New Orleans Honors Program

Maine
 (Related: List of colleges and universities in Maine)
 University of Maine, Honors College
 University of New England, Honors Program

Maryland
 (Related: List of colleges and universities in Maryland)
 Morgan State University, Honors College
 University of Maryland, Baltimore County Honors College
 University of Maryland Honors College
 Salisbury University Clarke Honors College 
 St. Mary's College of Maryland The Public Honors College
 Towson University Honors Program

Massachusetts
 (Related: List of colleges and universities in Massachusetts)
 Boston University Kilachand Honors College
 University of Massachusetts Amherst Commonwealth Honors College
 University of Massachusetts Lowell Honors College

Michigan
 (Related: List of colleges and universities in Michigan)
 Albion College, Prentiss M. Brown Honors Program
 Ferris State University Honors Program
 Grand Valley State University Frederik Meijer Honors College
 Michigan State University Honors College
 Oakland University Honors College
  at Michigan Technological University
 University of Michigan- Ann Arbor

 University of Michigan-Dearborn Honors Program
 Wayne State University Irving D. Reid Honors College
 Western Michigan University Lee Honors College

Minnesota
 (Related: List of colleges and universities in Minnesota)
 University of Minnesota, Honors Program

Mississippi
 (Related: List of colleges and universities in Mississippi)
 Alcorn State University Honors Program
 Jackson State University Honors College
 Mississippi State University Judy and Bobby Shackouls Honors College
 Sally McDonnell Barksdale Honors College
 University of Southern Mississippi Honors College

Missouri
 (Related: List of colleges and universities in Missouri)
 University of Missouri–Kansas City, 
 University of Missouri–St. Louis Pierre Laclede Honors College
 Drury University, 
 Rockhurst University, 
 Southeast Missouri State University

Montana
 (Related: List of colleges and universities in Montana)
 University of Montana Davidson Honors College

Nebraska
 (Related: List of colleges and universities in Nebraska)
 University of Nebraska–Lincoln, Honors Program
 University of Nebraska Omaha, Honors Program
 Creighton University, Honors Program

Nevada
 (Related: List of colleges and universities in Nevada)
 University of Nevada, Las Vegas, Honors College
 University of Nevada, Reno, Honors Program

New Hampshire
 (Related: List of colleges and universities in New Hampshire)
 Saint Anselm College, Honors Program
 Southern New Hampshire University, Honors Program
 University of New Hampshire, Honors Program

New Jersey
 (Related: List of colleges and universities in New Jersey)
 New Jersey Institute of Technology Albert Dorman Honors College
 Rutgers University 
 Fairleigh Dickinson University, Honors Programs
 The College of New Jersey Honors Program
 Florham Campus, Madison and Florham Park, New Jersey
 Metropolitan Campus, Teaneck and Hackensack, New Jersey
 Wroxton College, Wroxton, Oxfordshire, England
 Vancouver Campus, British Columbia, Canada

New Mexico
 (Related: List of colleges and universities in New Mexico)

 Western New Mexico University, Millennium III Honors Program
 New Mexico State University, Honors College
 San Juan College Honors Program
 The University of New Mexico Honors College

New York
 (Related: List of colleges and universities in New York)

Public institutions 

State University of New York (SUNY)
University centers and doctoral degree granting institutions
 Binghamton University
 Honors Program in Biochemistry
 Honors Program in Integrative Neuroscience
 The Pell Honors Program for PPL students (philosophy or politics or law)
 Scholars Program
 Stony Brook University
 Honors College
 University at Albany
 Honors College
 University at Buffalo
 Honors College
 College of Environmental Science and Forestry
 Honors Program
 Upper Division Honors Program

University colleges
 The College at Brockport
 Honors College
 Buffalo State College
 Muriel A. Howard Honors Program
 Cortland
 Honors Program
 Fredonia
 Honors Program
 Geneseo
 Edgar Fellows Program
 New Paltz
 Honors Program
 Old Westbury
 Honors College
 Oswego
 Honors Program
 Plattsburgh
 Honors Program
 Potsdam
 Honors Program

Professional institutes and colleges of technology
 Fashion Institute of Technology
 Honors Program
 Alfred State College
 Honors Program
 Canton
 Honors Program
 Cobleskill
 Honors Program
 Delhi
 Honors Program

City University of New York (CUNY)
 Senior and graduate colleges
 Baruch College
 Macaulay Honors College
 Brooklyn College
 Macaulay Honors College
 City College
 Macaulay Honors College
 The Skadden, Arps Honors Program in Legal Studies
 Hunter College
 Macaulay Honors College
 Queens College
 Macaulay Honors College
 Lehman College
 Macaulay Honors College
 College of Staten Island
 Macaulay Honors College
 John Jay College
 Macaulay Honors College
 New York City College of Technology (City Tech) at MetroTech
 Honors Program

Public institutions operated by private institutions 

 New York State College of Ceramics operated by Alfred University
 Honors Program
Cornell University (New York statutory college constituents)
 Cornell University College of Agriculture and Life Sciences
 CALS Research Honors Program

 College of Human Ecology
 Honors Program
 Fiber Science & Apparel Design Honors Program
 Design and Environmental Analysis Honors Program
 Department of Policy Analysis and Management, Policy Analysis and Management Honors Program

Private institutions (not for profit) 

 Adelphi University
 Honors College
 Alfred University
 Honors Program

 Bard College
 Al-Quds Bard Honors College

 Clarkson University
 Honors Program

 Colgate University
 Benton Scholars Program
 Lampert Institute for Civic and Global Affairs

 Columbia University
 Global Honors College

 Cornell University
 College of Arts and Sciences
 Honors Program in Biological Sciences
 Honors Program in Psychology
 Honors Program in Economics
 Department of Government Honors Program

 College of Engineering
 Honors Program in Computer Science
 Biological Engineering Honors Program
 Civil Engineering Honors Program
 Engineering Physics Honors Program
 Environmental Engineering Honors Program
 Independent Major Honors Program
 Information Science, Systems, and Technology Honors Program
 Materials Science and Engineering Honors Program
 Operations Research and Engineering Honors Program
 Science of Earth Systems Honors Program

 Daemen College
 Honors Program

 Hartwick College
 Honors Program

 Helene Fuld College of Nursing
 Honors Program

 Hofstra University
 Honors College
 Hobart and William Smith Colleges
 Honors Program
 Ithaca College
 Honors Program

 Long Island University
 LIU Brooklyn
 Honors College
 LIU Post (formerly C.W. Post)
 Honors Program
 
 Honors Green Program

 Manhattanville College
 Castle Scholars Honors Program

 Marist College, Honors Program

 Mercy College
 Honors Program

 The New School
 Riggio Honors Program

 New York Institute of Technology
 Dean of Engineering Honors Program

 New York University
 Presidential Honors Scholars Program
 WINS - Women in Science at NYU
 Tandon School of Engineering, Honors Program
 Steinhardt School of Culture, Education, and Human Development
 Honors Program
 Dean's Global Honors Seminars
 College of Arts & Science, Honors Program

 Pace University
 Pforzheimer Honors College

 Rochester Institute of Technology
 Honors Program

 Stevens Institute of Technology
 Pinnacle Scholars Honors Program

 Union College
 Scholars Program
 Seward Fellows

 University of Rochester
 Department of English Honors Program
 Department of History Honors Program
 Department of Anthropology
 College of Public Health Honors Program
 Clinical and Social Sciences in Psychology Honors Program
 Department of Modern Languages and Cultures Honors Program

 Utica College
 Honors Program

Private institutions (for profit) 

 Five Towns College
 Honors Program

Religious affiliated private institutions 

 Canisius College
 All-College Honors Program
 Fordham University
 Honors Program
 Rose Hill Honors Program

College of Mount Saint Vincent
 Honors Program

 College of New Rochelle
 Honors Program

 Houghton College
 London Honors Program
 East Meets West Honors Program
 Science Honors Program

 Iona College
 Honors Program

Le Moyne College
 Integral Honors Program

Niagara University
 Honors Program

 Nyack College
 Honors Program

St. Bonaventure University
 Honors Program

St. Francis College
 Honors Program
 Honors Independent Study Program

St. John Fisher College
 Honors Program

 St. John's University
 Honors Program

 St. Joseph's College
 Brooklyn campus, Honors Program
 Long Island campus Honors Program

 Syracuse University
 Renée Crown University Honors Program

 Wagner College
 Honors Program

Yeshiva University
 Stern College for Women, S. Daniel Abraham Honors Program
 Yeshiva College, Jay and Jeanie Schottenstein Honors Program
 Sy Syms School of Business, Business Honors and Entrepreneurial Leadership Program

North Carolina
 (Related: List of colleges and universities in North Carolina)
 Appalachian State University Honors College
 East Carolina University Honors College
 North Carolina A&T University Honors College
 North Carolina State University Honors Program
Salem College Honors Program
 University of North Carolina at Chapel Hill Honors Carolina
 University of North Carolina at Charlotte Honors College

North Dakota
 (Related: List of colleges and universities in North Dakota)
 University of North Dakota, Honors Program

Ohio
 (Related: List of colleges and universities in Ohio)
 University of Cincinnati University Honors Program
 Bowling Green State University 
 Central State University 
 Ohio Northern University / Honors Program
 Ohio State University / Honors and Scholars Program
 Ohio University/ Honors Tutorial College
 Miami University/ Honors Program
 Mount Vernon Nazarene University Honors Program
 Cleveland State University, Jack, Joseph & Morton Mandel Honors College
 Wright State University

Oklahoma
 (Related: List of colleges and universities in Oklahoma)

Oklahoma State University, Honors College

Oral Roberts University, Honors Program

Rogers State University, Honors Program

University of Oklahoma,

Oregon
 (Related: List of colleges and universities in Oregon)
 Robert D. Clark Honors College
 Oregon State University Honors College
 George Fox University Honors Program

Pennsylvania
 (Related: List of colleges and universities in Pennsylvania)

Public institutions 
 Indiana University of Pennsylvania, Robert E. Cook Honors College
 Pennsylvania State University, Schreyer Honors College
 University of Pittsburgh Honors College
 Temple University,

Private institutions 
 California University of Pennsylvania 
 Drexel University, Pennoni Honors College
 Point Park University 
 Swarthmore College

Rhode Island
 (Related: List of colleges and universities in Rhode Island)
 University of Rhode Island, Honors Program
 Rhode Island College, Honors Program
 Roger Williams University School of Law, Honors Program

South Carolina
 (Related: List of colleges and universities in South Carolina)
 The Citadel, The Military College of South Carolina Honors Program
 College of Charleston Honors College
 University of South Carolina Honors College
 Clemson University Honors College
 Converse College Honors Program
 Winthrop University Honors Program

South Dakota
 (Related: List of colleges and universities in South Dakota)
University of South Dakota Honors Program
Northern State University Honors Program

Tennessee
 (Related: List of colleges and universities in Tennessee)
 East Tennessee State University Honors College
 Fisk University Honors Program
 Middle Tennessee State University Honors College

Texas (36 public & 38 private universities) 
 (Related: List of colleges and universities in Texas)
Public institutions (6 university systems; 36 stand-alone universities)

University of Houston System (4 universities)
 The Honors College at the University of Houston

University of North Texas System (2 universities)
 University of North Texas, Denton, 

University of Texas System (9 universities)
 University of Texas at Arlington Honors College
 University of Texas at Austin

 University of Texas at Dallas Collegium V Honors Program
 University of Texas at El Paso Honors Program
 University of Texas at San Antonio Honors College
 University of Texas at Tyler Honors Program

Texas A&M University System (11 universities)
 Prairie View A&M University Honors Program
 Tarleton State University Honors Programs
 Texas A&M International University D.D. Hachar Honors Program
 Texas A&M University Honors Program
 Texas A&M University-Commerce Honors College 
 Texas A&M University–Corpus Christi Honors Program
 Texas A&M University at Galveston Honors Program
 Texas A&M University–Kingsville Honors College
 Texas A&M University–Texarkana Honors Program
 West Texas A&M University Honors Program

Texas Tech University System (2 universities)
 Angelo State University Honors Program
 Texas Tech University Honors College

Texas State University System (4 universities)
 Lamar University Reaud Honors College
 Sam Houston State University Elliott T. Bowers Honors College
 Sul Ross State University Honors Program
 Texas State University Honors College

Non-system affiliated (4 universities)
 Stephen F. Austin State University School of Honors
 Texas Southern University Thomas F. Freeman Honors College
 Texas Woman's University Honors Program

Private institutions (38 universities)

 Abilene Christian University Honors College
 Austin College Departmental Honors Program
 Baylor University Honors College
 Dallas Baptist University Honors Program
 Howard Payne University Honors Program
 Houston Baptist University Honors College
 Huston–Tillotson University W.E.B. DuBois Honors Program
 Rice University Scholars Program
 Southern Methodist University Honors Program
 St. Mary's University, Texas Honors Program
 Texas Christian University Honors College
 Texas Wesleyan University Honors Program
 University of the Incarnate Word Honors Program

Utah
 (Related: List of colleges and universities in Utah)
 Brigham Young University Honors Program
 Southern Utah University Honors Program
 University of Utah Honors College
 Westminster College Honors College

Vermont
 (Related: List of colleges and universities in Vermont)
University of Vermont Honors College

Virginia
 (Related: List of colleges and universities in Virginia)
 George Mason University, Honors College
 Hampton University, Honors College
 James Madison University, Honors College
 Longwood University, Honors College
 Mary Baldwin University, Global Honors Scholars Program
 Norfolk State University, Honors College
 Old Dominion University, Honors College
 Regent University, Honors Program
 Virginia CommonWealth University, Honors Program
 University of Mary Washington, Honors Program
 Virginia Wesleyan University,  Batten Honors College

Washington
 (Related: List of colleges and universities in Washington (state))

Central Washington University Honors College

 University of Washington Honors College
 Washington State University Honors College
 Western Washington University Honors Program
 Whitworth University Honors Program

West Virginia
 (Related: List of colleges and universities in West Virginia)

 Marshall University: Honors College
 West Virginia University Honors College

Wisconsin
 (Related: List of colleges and universities in Wisconsin)
 University of Wisconsin-Milwaukee Honors College
 University of Wisconsin-Stout Honors College

Wyoming
 (Related: List of colleges and universities in Wyoming)
 University of Wyoming Honors College

List 
 Honors Programs - The College Counselor for Gifted Kid
 Great Honors Programs at Public Universities
 NCHC: Link to undergraduate honors education

References

Lists of universities and colleges in the United States
Higher education-related lists
University programs